Casa de Piedra is a town and municipality in Santa María Department of Catamarca Province in northwestern Argentina.

References

Populated places in Catamarca Province